The 1997–98 United Counties League season was the 91st in the history of the United Counties League, a football competition in England.

Premier Division

The Premier Division featured 19 clubs which competed in the division last season, along with two new clubs:
Buckingham Town, relegated from the Southern Football League
Yaxley, promoted from Division One

League table

Division One

Division One featured 17 clubs which competed in the division last season, along with one new club:
Newport Pagnell Town, relegated from the Premier Division

League table

References

External links
 United Counties League

1997–98 in English football leagues
United Counties League seasons